Tupelo Military Institute was a institution of learning designed to prepare boys for entrance to college or university located in Tupelo, Mississippi. Founded in 1913 by George Washington Chapman, it closed in 1936.

The 1920s have been hailed as the "boom years," when the dormitories were filled and the school received full accreditation by the Southern Association of Schools and Colleges. In 1928, it became a member of the United States Association of Military Schools and was recognized for its outstanding curriculum.

In addition to daily military drills, athletics played an important role. All major sports were offered, including football, baseball, basketball, track, tennis, swimming, boxing, and wrestling. Perhaps the school's most famous athlete was Guy Bush. Bush pitched the baseball team to success.  In 1923, he was signed by the Chicago Cubs and won a game for them in the 1929 World Series, though the team lost the championship to the Philadelphia Athletics. In the 1932 season, Bush was a 19-game winner.

On September 25, 1927, tragedy struck the T.M.I. campus when fire, believed to have been caused by defective wiring in the attic, destroyed the school's main dormitory. A new dorm, utilizing much of the ground-floor structure of the original building, was completed by Christmas. 

In early 1936, after a visit with local banking officials, Chapman made the decision to sell the 16-acre campus and buildings to the city of Tupelo to be used as a state-supported junior college. On April 5, 1936, Tupelo was wrecked by one of the most destructive tornados in state history, however T.M.I.'s buildings and all 70-plus cadets and instructors were spared. There are some visible signs of the once-active campus in west Tupelo on Clayton Avenue, bordered on the south by Blair Street and on the north by West Jackson Street. In the few buildings that do remain are housed the Inspirational Community Baptist Church and some apartments.

References

Educational institutions established in 1913
Educational institutions disestablished in 1936
1913 establishments in Mississippi